Golden Wonder is a late maincrop russet skinned variety of potato. It is very dry and floury and is ideal for baking, roasting and frying, but needs close attention paid when boiling, as it will disintegrate in the boiling water if left too long. 

Despite common misconceptions, the Golden Wonder is unrelated to the better known King Edward variety. 

The potato was originally found in the UK, by a Mr. Brown of Arbroath, Scotland, in 1906. It is a periclinal chimera with an outer layer of the variety 'Golden Wonder' and an inner core of the variety 'Langworthy'.

Yields of this potato tend to be on the low side. Although they can be susceptible to some diseases, slug and blight resistance are reasonable.

The crisp company Golden Wonder was named after the potato.

References

Further reading
 Alan Romans, The Potato Book (2005) 

Potato cultivars

too simplistic to say "unsuitable for boiling"; it is unsuitable for steven boiling in the conventional way, but golden wonders make an excellent dry floury boiled potato if the boiling process is halted and the potato drained whilst it still retains a bone in it, before returning the pot to the hob at a low temp to allow the potato to continue cooking.